The Baba Diamond Fields is an area of widespread small-scale diamond mines located at the south-western district of Tsholotsho, Matabeleland North province in Zimbabwe, near the border neighbouring Botswana. It lies about 98 km north-west of the city of Bulawayo and has Kalahari sand soils and rock formations which also can be found at the diamond-rich areas of neighbour Botswana. Currently Baba Diamond Fields is owned by Infinity Baba Diamond Group since 2015 and estimated annual diamond production at the mines to be 1 million carats of rough diamonds.

Geology of the Deposit 
The Baba Diamond Fields consists of three kimberlite pipes, and are known for recovery of large, high-quality, exceptional Type II diamonds. High quality pink and blue diamonds have also been produced from the mines.{
  "type": "FeatureCollection",
  "features": [
    {
      "type": "Feature",
      "properties": {},
      "geometry": {
        "type": "Point",
        "coordinates": [
          26.740722656250004,
          -19.787380181986222
        ]
      }
    }
  ]
}

References

Baba Diamond Fields 

Diamond mines in Zimbabwe